Song for Someone is the second album led by trumpeter and composer Kenny Wheeler which was recorded in 1973 and released on the Incus label. The album was rereleased on CD on Psi Records in 2004.

Reception

The Allmusic review by Steve Loewy noted "This recording has a split personality: much of it comes from a solid, 1970s jazz big band perspective, with occasional emblems of the era (such as electric piano), and consistently solid solos, especially from the leader, trumpeter Kenny Wheeler... often known for his work in ensembles in which free improvisation is the unifying factor... Some might find it disconcerting that two seemingly disparate styles are juxtaposed together. Others will see it as evidencing the breadth of the music". Uncut's review of the 2004 reissue called it "one of the great British orchestral jazz records".

Track listing
All compositions by Kenny Wheeler.
 "Toot-Toot"- 4:14
 "Ballad Two" - 8:26
 "Song for Someone" - 2:40
 "Causes are Events" - 8:15
 "The Good Doctor" - 15:15
 "Nothing Changes" (lyrics by Norma Winstone) - 4:23

Personnel
Kenny Wheeler - trumpet, flugelhorn
Greg Bowen, Ian Hamer, Dave Hancock - trumpet
Keith Christie, David Horler, Bobby Lamb, Chris Pyne - trombone
Malcolm Griffiths (track 5), Jim Wilson (tracks 1-4 & 6) - bass trombone
Alfie Reece - tuba
Mike Osborne - alto saxophone
Duncan Lamont - tenor saxophone, flute
Alan Branscombe - piano, electric piano
John Taylor - electric piano
Ron Mathewson - bass
Tony Oxley - percussion
Norma Winstone - voice
Derek Bailey - guitar (track 5)
Evan Parker - soprano saxophone, tenor saxophone (tracks 4 & 5)

References

Incus Records albums
Kenny Wheeler albums
1973 albums
Psi Records albums